Myristica malabarica is a species of plant in the family Myristicaceae. It is endemic to the Western Ghats in southwest India. It is threatened by habitat loss according to the IUCN Red List. It can reach up to 25 m long and its bark is greenish black, smooth and sometimes reddish.

Names in local languages: Kattujathi (literally wild nutmeg), Kattujathikka, Kottappannu, Panampalka, Pathiripoovu, Ponnampannu, Ponnampayin, and Ponnampu in Malayalam; Kanage, and Doddajajikai in Kannada; Rampatri in Hindi.

It is used in Ayurvedic medicine. M. malabarica is used to adulterate true nutmeg, which comes from Myristica fragrans.

Both Myristica magnifica and M. malabarica are endangered trees that are native to Western Ghats. The swamp lands and lowlands where they normally grow have been significantly drained for agricultural use.

References

External links

malabarica
Vulnerable plants
Flora of the Indian subcontinent
Taxonomy articles created by Polbot